Posht Qaleh (also Romanized as Posht Qal‘eh) is a village in Jaber-e Ansar Rural District, in the Central District of Abdanan County, Ilam Province, Iran. At the 2006 census, its population was 1,231, in 255 families.

Demographics 
Linguistic composition of the city.

References 

Populated places in Abdanan County
Kurdish settlements in Ilam Province
Luri settlements in Ilam Province